Susan Georgina Pollard (born 7 November 1949) is an English actress and singer. Her career has spanned over 45 years; she is most famous for her role in the sitcom Hi-de-Hi!. She also appeared in You Rang, M'Lord? and Oh, Doctor Beeching!. 

Pollard has appeared in over 35 stage plays and musicals, as well as over 40 pantomimes. As a singer, she scored a UK number-two hit with the song "Starting Together" in 1986 and also released an album.

Early life and education
Pollard was born in Nottingham, the eldest daughter of Don and Hilda Pollard. Her interest in acting began at the age of six when she played an angel in a school nativity play. She attended Berridge Road School, Hyson Green and Peveril Bilateral School, Robin's Wood Road (now Nottingham Girls' Academy). After leaving school at the age of 16, she got a job at the Tennant Rubber Company in Carlton as a shorthand typist and began singing in working men's clubs and charity shows.

Career

Following an apprenticeship at the Arts Theatre in Nottingham, Pollard appeared on Opportunity Knocks in 1974, singing "I Cain't Say No" from Oklahoma!, and came second to a singing Jack Russell.

She went on to play in the musicals The Desert Song and Rose-Marie with John Hanson, starred in the Cameron Mackintosh West End production of Godspell, played opposite Jack Wild in Big Sin City at the Roundhouse, toured in the musical Grease in a company that also included Tracey Ullman, appeared with Tim Brooke-Taylor and Hugh Paddick in the farce Not Now Darling, won a role in Andrew Sachs's play Philately Will Get You Nowhere and appeared at the Mermaid Theatre in a celebration of the music of Cole Porter, titled Oh Mr. Porter!

Pollard's first comedy role was in a BBC series screened in 1979 entitled Two Up, Two Down, in which she played a hippy named Flo. Paul Nicholas played her partner, Jimmy, both of whom were squatting in the house of a nice middle-class couple. It only lasted for one series, but then later that year came the pilot programme for a new BBC comedy written by Jimmy Perry and David Croft set in a holiday camp. Pollard landed the role of chalet maid Peggy Ollerenshaw in Hi-de-Hi!. She continued in this role until the programme's end in 1988, by which time she had become a household name.

In 1981, she became one of the presenters of children's magazine show Get Set for Summer, in which she delivered wacky reports and bogus weather forecasts.

During the run of Hi-de-Hi! Pollard also had a singing career, and in 1986, she reached No. 2 in the UK Singles Chart with the song "Starting Together", the theme song from the BBC Television 'fly-on-the-wall' documentary series The Marriage. It was her only Top 40 hit; her first single, "Come To Me (I Am Woman)", had reached No. 71 in 1985 and her only charting album, Su, peaked at No. 86 in the UK Albums Chart in November 1986. In 1987, she toured the UK with The Su Pollard Show and co-hosted It's a Royal Knockout.

Pollard also starred in the stage production of Hi De Hi! - The Holiday Musical, along with almost all of the cast from the television series, played sell out seasons in Bournemouth, London and Blackpool. In 1985 she played Sally in the West End production of Me And My Girl at the Adelphi Theatre which she appeared in for over a year. Then came roles in a national tour of Rodgers and Hart's Babes In Arms playing Bunny Byron opposite Matthew Kelly, and the title role in Sweet Charity at the Connaught Theatre, Worthing. 

Pollard also appeared in a number of television adverts, Typhoo, Walls, Kit Kats, with comedy star Roy Kinnear, Heineken lager, Toymaster toy stores, Ideal World shopping and the British Safety Council. She also wrote two books, Hearts and Showers and Sensible Slimming.

Shortly after Hi-de-Hi! had ended, the writers David Croft and Jimmy Perry chose Pollard to star as Ivy Teasdale in their new sitcom You Rang, M'Lord?, which starred her Hi-de-Hi! co-stars Paul Shane and Jeffrey Holland. This period sitcom ran from 1988 to 1993. In 1988, she won the "Rear of the Year" award. In 1989 she hosted the short-lived ITV game show Take The Plunge, which was cancelled after one season. From 1993 until 1996, Pollard starred opposite Gorden Kaye in For Better or Worse, a BBC Radio 2 sitcom about an engaged-to-be-married couple. In 1995 Pollard took over as the face of the National Egg Awareness Campaign. From 1995 to 1997 she played Ethel Schumann in another David Croft sitcom Oh, Doctor Beeching!. From 1989 to 1990, Pollard's distinctive voice voiced the lead character in the BBC children's television series Penny Crayon.

More recently, Pollard made a guest appearance in Gimme Gimme Gimme in 2001 and voiced Noisy in Little Robots. In 2001, she presented Songs of Praise three times. She has made four appearances on Just a Minute, and also regularly appears in pantomimes and other stage shows, including Annie and The Pirates of Penzance. In 2008, Pollard starred in the musical Shout! alongside Claire Sweeney. From April 2009, Pollard appeared in the London transfer of Shout! at the Arts Theatre. In December 2010, Pollard had a guest role in the Christmas special of ITV's hit show Benidorm, playing herself. In December 2011, Pollard appeared as a guest on BBC One's Strictly Come Dancing. In the 2012 movie Run For Your Wife she had a cameo role as the newsagent. She starred in Who's Doing the Dishes? in September 2016. In 2018 she appeared in ITV's Last Laugh in Vegas.

In pantomime, Pollard appears mainly as the Wicked Queen in Snow White and The Seven Dwarfs, appearing in recent years at Sunderland, Blackpool, Tunbridge Wells, Aylesbury and Malvern.

In 2019, Pollard starred as Queen Rat in Dick Whittington in Wolverhampton, alongside her Hi-de-Hi! co star Jeffrey Holland.

Personal life
Pollard was married to Peter Keogh from 1984 to 1992. In 2014, Keogh published his memoir, My Hi-de-High Life: Before, During and After Su Pollard.

Pollard is related to journalist and former Blue Peter presenter Liz Barker and is a supporter of Nottingham Forest football club.

Theatre
 1974/75: Godspell  National Tour
 1975: The Desert Song National Tour
 1976: Rose-Marie  National Tour
 1977: Oh Mr Porter! Mermaid Theatre
 1978: Big Sin City National Tour
 1979: Grease Astoria Theatre, as Cha-Cha
 1979: Grease National Tour, as Cha-Cha
 1981: Philately Will Get You Nowhere
 1981: Not Now Darling Plymouth Hoe Theatre, as Janie
 1983: Hi-de-Hi! The Holiday Musical Bournemouth, as Peggy
 1983/84: Hi-de-Hi! The Holiday Musical Victoria Palace, London, as Peggy
 1984: Hi-de-Hi! The Holiday Musical Opera House, Blackpool, as Peggy
 1985: Babes in Arms National Tour, as Bunny Byron
 1985/86: Me and My Girl Adelphi Theatre, as Sally Smith
 1986: Sweet Charity Connaught Theatre Season, as Charity Hope
 1986: Sweet Charity National Tour, as Charity Hope
 1987: The Su Pollard Show National Tour
 1987: A Song, A Frock and A Tinkle Donmar Warehouse
 1987: A Song, A Frock and A Tinkle National Tour
 1991: Don't Dress For Dinner National Tour, as Suzette
 1991: Don't Dress For Dinner New Zealand Tour, as Suzette
 1992: The Good Sex Guide Revue New Zealand Tour
 1993: Harbeas Corpus Far East Tour
 1994: Little Shop Of Horrors National Tour, as Audrey
 1995: Blackpool's Biggest Show North Pier Blackpool
 1997: That's Showbiz Wimbledon Theatre, as Pam
 1998: See How They Run Bournemouth Summer Season, as Miss Skillon
 1998: See How They Run National Tour, as Miss Skillon
 2000: Abigail's Party National Tour, as Angela
 2001: The Pirates Of Penzance National Tour, as Pirate Maid Ruth
 2002/03: Annie National Tour, as Miss Hannigan
 2003: The Vagina Monologues National Tour
 2004: A Happy Medium National Tour, as Ellen Small
 2004: Annie National Tour, as Miss Hannigan
 2005: The Vagina Monologues National Tour
 2006: Romeo and Juliet National Tour, as The Nurse
 2006: The Vagina Monologues National Tour
 2007: Menopause The Musical Shaw Theatre, as
 2008: Shout! The Swinging 60s Musical National Tour, as Aunt Yvonne
 2009: Shout! The Swinging 60s Musical Arts Theatre, as Aunt Yvonne
 2009: Annie National Tour, as Miss Hannigan
 2010: Annie National Tour, as Miss Hannigan
 2011: Annie National Tour, as Miss Hannigan
 2012: Annie Hong Kong/Singapore, as Miss Hannigan
 2014: Annie New Zealand Tour, as Miss Hannigan
 2014: Ha Ha Hood! And The Prince Of Leaves National Tour, as Maid Marian
 2015: In Conversation With Tim Macarthur
 2017: La Voi Meets Su Pollard
 2018: Harpy Edinburgh Fringe, as Birdie
 2019 “Dick Whittington” Wolverhampton Grand Theatre as Queen Rat
 2020: Harpy National Tour, as Birdie

Filmography

Feature films
 2012: Run For Your Wife, Cameo

Television roles
 1979: Two Up, Two Down, as Flo
 1980 - 1988: Hi-de-Hi!, as Peggy Ollerenshaw
 1988, 1990 - 1993: You Rang, M'Lord?, as Ivy Teasdale
 1989: According To Daisy (Unaired Pilot Episode only), as Daisy
 1989: Penny Crayon, as Penny (Animation, Voiceover)
 1993: The World of Peter Rabbit and Friends, as Jemima Puddle-Duck (Animation, Voiceover)
 1995 - 1997: Oh, Doctor Beeching!, as Ethel Schuman
 2001: Gimme Gimme Gimme, as Heidi Honeycomb
 2003: Little Robots, as Noisy (Animation, Voiceover)
 2010: Benidorm - Christmas Special, as herself
 2016: Hacker Time, as Mrs Cupelle
 2018: Last Laugh In Vegas, as herself
 2018: Claude, as Gloria Swoon (Animation, Voiceover)
 2018: Doctors, as Mary
 2019: Andy and The Band, as Mary
 2020: Celebrity Murder Mystery
 2021: Celebrity Masterchef
 2021: Celebrity Masterchef: Christmas Cook Off

Television appearances
 1974: Opportunity Knocks
 1981: The Saturday Picture Show
 1982: Me and My Town
 1982: The Russell Harty Show
 1982: The Grace Kennedy Show
 1982: No. 73
 1982: Give Us A Clue
 1982: The Royal Variety Performance
 1983: Wogan
 1983: Saturday Superstore
 1983: Breakfast Time
 1983: The Kenny Everett Show
 1983: Entertainment Express
 1984: Sunday Sunday
 1984: Aspel & Co
 1984: TV:AM/Good Morning Britain
 1984: Look Who's Talking
 1984: The Laughter Show
 1985: Live Aid
 1985: The Royal Variety Performance
 1985: Night of 100 Stars
 1985: The Val Doonican Show
 1985: The Bob Monkhouse Show
 1985: Pebble Mill At One
 1985: Tom O'Connor's Roadshow
 1986: The Royal Variety Performance
 1986: Top Of The Pops
 1986: Joan Rivers - Can We Talk?
 1986: TV:AM/Good Morning Britain
 1986: Pebble Mill At One
 1986: Off The Record
 1986: TV:AM/Good Morning Britain
 1987: Pebble Mill At One
 1987: Open Air
 1987: It's A Royal Knockout
 1987: Jackanory
 1988: Let's Face The Music Of
 1988: Give Us A Clue
 1988: Star Memories
 1988: Through The Keyhole
 1988: Mid-Day Show (Australia)
 1989: This Is Your Life
 1989: Take The Plunge
 1990: Daytime Live
 1991: Coast To Coast People
 1993: The World Of Peter Rabbits & Friends
 1993: Channel 4's Love Weekend
 1993: Noel's House Party (Gotcha!)
 1995: The Ant and Dec Show
 1995: Call Up The Stars
 1997: This Morning
 1997: The Generation Game
 1999: Just A Minute
 2001: I Love 1986
 2001: Songs Of Praise
 2002: RI:SE
 2003: Liquid News
 2003: Stars Reunited - Hi-de-Hi! Special
 2003: Scotland Today
 2003: The Weakest Link
 2004: Songs Of Praise
 2004: Comedy Connections - Hi-de-Hi!
 2005: Loose Women
 2005: Dick and Dom In Da Bungalow
 2006: Loose Women
 2006: The Best Of The Royal Variety
 2006: Loose Women
 2006: The Princes Trust 30th Birthday Live (Blankety Blank)
 2007: The Paul O'Grady Show
 2007: This Morning
 2007: Destination Lunch
 2007: Loose Women
 2007: Anglia Tonight
 2007: The Paul O'Grady Show
 2007: Loose Women
 2008: BBC News
 2008: Central Tonight
 2008: Loose Women
 2008: Look North
 2009: Loose Women
 2009: Richard & Judy
 2009: Daily Cooks Challenge
 2009: BBC Breakfast
 2009: Loose Women
 2009: Look North
 2009: Daily Cooks
 2010: Loose Women
 2010: This Morning
 2011: Bucks TV
 2011: This Morning
 2011: Loose Women
 2011: Strictly Come Dancing Christmas Special
 2011: ... Sings The Beatles
 2011: You Have Been Watching... David Croft
 2012: The Big Fat Quiz Of The 80s
 2012: Strictly Come Dancing - It Takes Two 
 2012: Blackpool's Big Night Out
 2013: Les Dawson: An Audience With That Never Was
 2013: Piers Morgan's Life Stories: Gloria Hunniford
 2013: Big Brother's Bit On The Side
 2013: Pointless Celebrities
 2013: The Paul O'Grady Show
 2013: TVNZ Breakfast (New Zealand)
 2013: Good Morning (New Zealand)
 2013: 3 News (New Zealand)
 2013: All Aboard: East Coast Trains
 2014: Good Morning (New Zealand)
 2014: Pointless Celebrities
 2015: Lorraine
 2015: Pointless Celebrities
 2016: Big Brother's Bit On The Side
 2016: Celebrity Antiques Road Trip
 2016: Whose Doing The Dishes?
 2016: Lorraine
 2017: The Baby Boomer's Guide To Growing Old
 2017: 100: A Tribute To Dame Vera Lynn
 2017: Lorraine
 2017: Strictly Come Dancing - It Takes Two
 2017: Big Brother's Bit On The Side
 2018: Loose Women
 2018: BBC Breakfast
 2018: Through The Keyhole
 2018: Keith & Paddy's Picture Show (Gremlins)
 2019: Britain's Favourite Chocolate Bar
 2019: Strictly Come Dancing - It Takes Two
 2019: Pointless Celebrities
 2019: Britain's Favourite Crisp
 2019: When Talent Shows Go Horribly Wrong
 2020: Celebrity The Chase
 2022: Blankety Blank
 2022: Richard Osman's Festive House Of Games

Discography

Singles
October 1985: "Come to Me (I Am Woman)" (UK No. 71)
January 1986: "Starting Together" (UK No. 2)
July 1986: "You've Lost That Loving Feeling"
November 1986: "Wives Will Always Be the Last to Know"
March 1987: "Come to Me (I Am Woman)" (re-issue)
1990: "My Miracle"

Albums
November 1986: Su (UK No. 86)
2001: The Collection

References

External links
Official Su Pollard website

1949 births
Living people
English stage actresses
English television actresses
English voice actresses
Actors from Nottingham
Pollard, Su